John S. Myers served as Los Angeles City Auditor and Los Angeles City Controller for a total of 28 years.

Meyers served as Auditor of the City of Los Angeles longer than anyone else. He succeeded William C. Mushet in 1909 and held the title of Auditor until it was changed to Controller in 1925 under the new city charter. He served in that capacity until he resigned on January 19, 1937. 

Los Angeles City Controllers
Year of birth missing

Year of death missing